Anonychia is the absence of fingernails or toenails, an anomaly which may be the result of a congenital ectodermal defect, ichthyosis, severe infection, severe allergic contact dermatitis, self-inflicted trauma, Raynaud phenomenon, lichen planus, epidermolysis bullosa, or severe exfoliative diseases.

Congenital form
This is rare and is usually due to mutations in the R-spondin 4 (RSPO4) gene which is located on the short arm of chromosome 20 (20p13). Clinically it is manifest by the absence (anonychia) or hypoplasia (hyponychia) of finger- or toenails.

See also 
 List of cutaneous conditions

References

External links 

 

Conditions of the skin appendages